Depois da Guerra (English: After the War) is the tenth studio album by Oficina G3, and the fifth released by MK Music. This is the first album with the new lead vocalist Mauro Henrique. The band won the 2009 Latin Grammy Award for Best Christian Album (Portuguese Language) in 2009.

Track listing
 "D.A.G." - 1:05
 "Meus Próprios Meios" - 4:53		(My Own Ways)
 "Eu Sou" - 5:53			(I Am)
 "Meus Passos" - 5:04			(My Steps)
 "Continuar" - 4:28			(Continue)
 "De Joelhos" - 5:20			(On My Knees)
 "Tua Mão" - 4:27			(Thy Hand)
 "Muros" - 4:59			(Walls)
 "Depois Da Guerra" - 4:55		(After The War)
 "A Ele" - 4:40			(To Him)
 "Incondicional" - 4:16		(Unconditional)
 "Obediência" - 5:05			(Obedience)
 "Better" - 6:22
 "People Get Ready" - 4:01
 "Unconditional" - 4:15

Personnel
 Mauro Henrique – vocals
 Juninho Afram – guitar, vocals
 Duca Tambasco – bass
 Jean Carllos – keyboards

Additional personnel
 Celso Machado – guitar on "People Get Ready"
 Alexandre Aposan – drums

Certifications

References

External links
 Official website
 MK Music page
 Latin Grammy Awards
 Latin Grammy Awards II

2008 albums
Oficina G3 albums
Latin Grammy Award for Best Christian Album (Portuguese Language)